Comedy Raja Kalakkal Rani was a 2021 Indian-Tamil Language comedy series, which premiered on 27 June 2021 and broadcast on Star Vijay. The show is hosted by video and radio jockey Rakshan and television host Priyanka Deshpande. the show was telecasted every Sunday at 1:30pm. The show launched on 27 June 2021 and held its finale episode on 14 November 2021. Madurai Muthu, Baba Bhaskar, Aishwarya and Uma Riyaz Khan served as the judges for this show.

The show was won by duo Sunita Gogi and TSK. While other duo Rithika Tamil Selvi and KYP Bala emerged as the runner up of the show. While Ramar and Deepa Shankar emerged as third place and Vinodh and Pranika emerged as fourth place. Actor Jiiva also appeared as a special guest and judge during the grand finale.

Format
The format of this show is that 10 male comedians will pair up with 10 female television actresses individually. The duo who performs the best comedy act in the week and receive high scores from the judging panel will excel to the next round, however the duo with the least amount of points that week will be eliminated from the show. The duo who wins the show receives 3 lakh cash prize and a trophy.

Series

Contestants result

Duo's
Following are the duos who participated as contestants in the show:
 Sunita Gogoi and TSK
Rithika Tamil Selvi and KYP Bala
Raju Jeyamohan and Aranthangi Nisha
Ramar and Deepa Shankar
Vinodh and Pranika
Satish and Gayatri
Jayachandran and Archana
Pugazh and Archana 
Yogi and Shabnam
Dharsha Gupta and Raja Velu

Competition Table

Legend Key 
  indicates the King and the Queen (winners).
  indicates the 1st runner-up.
  indicates the 2nd runner-up.
  indicates the 3rd runner-up.
  indicates the eliminated duo's.
  indicates the Duo has advanced to the next round in the competition.
  indicates the Duo quit competition.

References

External links 
 Official Website at Hotstar
 

Star Vijay original programming
Tamil-language reality television series
Television shows set in Tamil Nadu
Tamil-language stand-up comedy television series
2021 Tamil-language television series debuts
2021 Tamil-language television series endings
Tamil-language television shows